River Forest High School is a secondary school located in Lake Station, Indiana, with a Hobart postal address, serving grades 7–12. It is the secondary school in the River Forest Community School Corporation, serving the entire town of New Chicago, portions of the cities of Gary, Hobart and Lake Station, and unincorporated areas in Hobart Township, Lake County. It opened in 1958. The Golden Ingot Marching Band can be viewed in the Saint Patrick's Day Parade in the film The Fugitive.

Academics
River Forest's high school academic team consists of United States Academic Decathlon, Spell Bowl and Academic Super Bowl. River Forest participated in the Online Nationals for United States Academic Decathlon.

Athletics
River Forest's athletic teams are known as the Ingots, harking back to the steel-making heritage of the area. They belong to the Greater South Shore Athletic Conference and their colors are cardinal red and gold. River Forest offers the following sports:
Baseball (boys)
Basketball (boys & girls)
Cross country (boys & girls)
Football (boys) (1990 2A IHSAA state runners-up)
Golf (boys)
Soccer (boys and girls)
Softball (girls)
Tennis (boys & girls)
Track (boys & girls)
Volleyball (girls)
Wrestling (boys)

See also
 List of high schools in Indiana

References

External links
School's website

Educational institutions established in 1958
Public high schools in Indiana
Schools in Lake County, Indiana
1958 establishments in Indiana